Park Ridge, Illinois, is a suburb of Chicago. Despite its relative small city status, Park Ridge has been home to several notable people. Among the most admired women in the world, former first lady, U.S. Senator, U.S. Secretary of State, and 2016 Democratic presidential nominee Hillary Rodham Clinton grew up in Park Ridge and graduated from Maine South High School. Actor Harrison Ford, the star of Indiana Jones, Star Wars, and The Fugitive also attended high school in Park Ridge. Ford's films have grossed over $3.5 billion domestically, making him the third-highest-grossing U.S. domestic box office star of all time. Two-time Super Bowl champion (XVII, XXII) Dave Butz and Hall of Fame third baseman Ron Santo, 1st baseman Detroit Tigers, 1984 World Series Champion Dave Bergman all grew up in Park Ridge. Major League Baseball players Adam Rosales and Luke Gregerson are from Park Ridge, and Hall of Fame catcher Gabby Hartnett moved to Park Ridge later in life. More recognized by his work than by name, Park Ridge resident Grant Wood painted American Gothic, one of the most familiar images in 20th-century American art.

The following list includes notable people who were born or have lived in Park Ridge, Illinois. For a similar list organized alphabetically by last name, see the category page People from Park Ridge, Illinois.

Academics and engineering

Fine arts

Art by local artists

Media and literature

Performing arts

Acting

Dancing

Music

Politics and law

Sports

Baseball

Luke Williams (born 1996), baseball player for the San Francisco Giants of Major League Baseball

Basketball

Football

Hockey

Ice skating

Rowing

Soccer

Volleyball

References

Park Ridge
Park Ridge